Marietta Kies (December 31, 1853 – July 20, 1899) was an American philosopher and educator who belonged to the St. Louis Hegelians. She was the second American woman to receive a PhD in philosophy, after May Gorslin Preston Slosson (1858–1943), and taught full-time at a university.

Life 
Marietta Kies was born in Killingly, Connecticut, the second of five daughters to Miranda Young and William Knight Kies. For a woman of the time, she received a good education and earned a bachelor's degree from Mount Holyoke Seminary (1881), where she studied from 1881 to 1882 and, after teaching at Colorado College (1882–85), again from 1885 to 1891, philosophy of mind and moral philosophy. Kies belonged to the American idealists, a philosophical movement also known as St. Louis Hegelians because it began in St. Louis in the 1860s, after the first translations and interpretations of German philosophers such as Hegel, Fichte and Schelling appeared. From the mid-1880s, she studied first under William Torrey Harris at the Concord School of Philosophy in Massachusetts. During this time, she edited Harris' lectures and essays on epistemology and metaphysics under the title An Introduction to the Study of Philosophy (1889). She then studied, on the recommendation of Harris, at the University of Michigan, where she studied under George Sylvester Morris, Henry Carter Adams and John Dewey. In 1889, Kies received her master's and in 1891, with a thesis on The Ethical Principle and Its Application in State Relations, she earned her PhD.

From 1891 to 1892, Kies was recruited by Mills College in Oakland, California, to succeed President Susan Tolman Mills. However, Mills was dissatisfied with her teaching methods and fired her. As it was proving difficult to find a job as a college-level teacher, Kies, as was not unusual among academics of her time, went to Europe to study. She spent the academic year 1892–93 in Leipzig and Zurich, until she took the position of high school director in Plymouth, Massachusetts, and finally taught philosophy at Butler University in Indiana from 1896 to 1899.

Kies died of tuberculosis on July 20, 1899 at the age of 45 in Pueblo, Colorado.

Philosophy 
With The Ethical Principle and Its Application in State Relations (1892), her doctoral thesis, and Institutional Ethics (1894), Marietta Kies published two independent works of political philosophy in which she contrasts "justice" or egoism with "grace" or altruism and suggests, how these could complement each other in society. The second book was essentially a new version of the first, but with some important additions about school, family, jurisdiction and the role of the church in society. According to Kies, both justice and grace have a place in economic and political decision-making processes, but grace should be more central and also be enforced by the state. As a Christian Socialist, Kies was an early proponent of welfare programs aimed at combating poverty.

Kies was not a strong advocate of women's rights, but she also touched on women's issues in her work. She updated Hegel's view of the family by asserting the individuality of women within the household — a place where for Hegel unity, not individuality, is paramount. Since women were already more involved in public in the late 19th century, Kies saw no need for women to remain privatem, subjective and fully engaged in the role of wives and mothers. However, Kies also saw no need to fully involve women in political life and felt that they should only have the right to vote in areas that they believe directly affect them (e.g. education, public health and labor law).

Publications

Books 

 The Ethical Principle and its Application to State Relations. Island Press / Register Pub. Co., Ann Arbor 1892 (also Ph. D. thesis, University of Michigan 1891).
 Institutional Ethics. Allyn & Bacon, Boston 1894.

References

Further reading 
 

1853 births
1899 deaths
19th-century American philosophers
19th-century deaths from tuberculosis
American Christian socialists
American women philosophers
Butler University faculty
Hegelian philosophers
Mount Holyoke College alumni
Mills College faculty
People from Killingly, Connecticut
Tuberculosis deaths in Colorado
University of Michigan alumni